Oath Breaker or Oathbreaker may refer to:
 Perjurer, someone who intentionally swears a false oath or falsifies an affirmation to tell the truth
 Oath Breaker (novel), a 2008 novel by Michelle Paver
 Oathbreaker (band), from Belgium
 "Oathbreaker" (Game of Thrones), an episode of Game of Thrones
 Oathbreakers, a 1989 novel in the Mercedes Lackey bibliography